Æon Spoke  is the second studio album by American band Æon Spoke, led by Paul Masvidal and Sean Reinert.

Track listing

Personnel 
 Paul Masvidal – vocals, guitar
 Sean Reinert – drums, percussion, keyboards & backing vocals
 Evo – guitar

Guest musicians:

 Chris Tristram - bass 
 R. Walt Vincent - bass, background vocals, keys 
 Evan Slamka - background vocals
 Paul Hepker - keys

External links 
 Æon Spoke album info at Discogs

References

2007 albums
Æon Spoke albums